Felicity Ward (born 26 September 1980) is an Australian comedian, best known for her TV appearances on Spicks and Specks, Thank God You're Here, Good News Week and as a writer/performer in the  Channel 10 Network television programme The Ronnie Johns Half Hour. She is a part of The 3rd Degree, who made and starred in The Ronnie Johns Half Hour.

Early life
Ward grew up in Killcare, a small coastal town on the Central Coast of New South Wales.

Career

Early TV and stage work
She first came to public attention in the Logie-nominated sketch show The Ronnie Johns Half Hour, especially her character work as six-year-old Poppy, German nihilist Gretchen and lawn bowls instructor Heidi.

Ward made several appearances on the ABC's Spicks and Specks during its six-year run until 2011. She also hosted The Comedy Hour on 774 ABC Melbourne.

From 2006 to 2009, Ward has performed alongside fellow 3rd Degree member Heath Franklin (as Chopper) in the highly popular comedy festival show "Chopper's Fuckin Bingo". Ward played Chopper's ball girl and drug addict niece, Jenny. It has been performed in Melbourne, Adelaide and Sydney, including Chopper's Fuckin Christmas Bingo in 2007.

Solo stand up success
At the 2008 Melbourne Fringe Festival, Ward performed her debut full-length solo stand-up show, "Felicity Ward's Ugly as A Child Variety Show" to popular and critical acclaim, culminating in her winning the Melbourne Airport Award for Best Newcomer.

In 2009, Ward brought her award-winning "Ugly As A Child Variety Show" to the Adelaide Fringe (20 February - 21 March), the Melbourne International Comedy Festival (1–26 April), the Sydney Comedy Festival (12–17 May) and the Edinburgh Festival Fringe (7-31 August). Produced by Laughing Stock Productions, the show was a commercial and critical hit, selling out shows in all cities. Ward was nominated for Best Newcomer at the 2009 MICF and won Mervyn Stutter's Spirit of the Fringe Award at the Edinburgh Festival Fringe.

In September 2009, Ward appeared at the Melbourne Fringe Festival with a new show - "Felicity Ward reads from The Book of Moron", a hybrid storytelling/stand-up show with music. She performed the show at the 2010 Adelaide Fringe, Brisbane Comedy Festival and Melbourne International Comedy Festival.

On 22 March 2010 Ward appeared on the Melbourne International Comedy Festival Gala on Network 10.

2011 saw Ward appear in front of sell-out crowds with her critically acclaimed show, "Honestly," culminating in winning Best Local Act at the Time out Sydney Comedy Festival Awards 2011. She was also named in the Sydney Morning Herald'''s Top 10 comedy shows for 2011, was the face of the Melbourne International Comedy Festival and garnered four star reviews all over the country. She toured internationally: to Hong Kong and Singapore, with the Melbourne International Comedy Festival Roadshow, and to New Zealand, with the Comedy Convoy. She also performed a variety style show at the Melbourne Fringe Festival in September 2011 called Felicity Ward's (week-long, ill-timed) Christmas Special.

Her new show, "The Hedgehog Dilemma", was performed at the 2012 Adelaide Fringe Festival and the Melbourne International Comedy Festival with sell-out seasons and nominated Best Comedy at both festivals. It was then performed the Sydney Comedy Festival and Perth Comedy Festival where she won Best Australian Act at both festivals. It has now been invited to the Edinburgh Fringe Festival in 2012, and a short run at the Soho Theatre in London following that.

Ward performed at Latitude Festival in 2014, 2016 and 2019. Her 2018 show "Busting a Nut" was nominated for Best Show at the Edinburgh Comedy Awards.

Supporting roles
Ward had a well received supporting role in the 2012 Australian comedy Any Questions for Ben?, created by Working Dog Productions.

In 2014, Ward appeared as Lizzie in The Inbetweeners 2 and in 2015 she appeared as a stand-up guest on The John Bishop Show.

Ward has featured as a guest host on a number of episodes of the satirical comedy podcast, The Bugle''.

Personal life
Ward has been open about her struggles with anxiety and is an active advocate for mental health in Australia. She also spoke about her issues with Irritable Bowel Syndrome in her 2015 show "What If There's No Toilet?"  and about anxiety, depression and insomnia as part of her BBC Radio 4 series "Appisodes".

References

External links

Felicity Ward on Facebook

Australian women comedians
Living people
1980 births
People from New South Wales
21st-century Australian comedians